In cellular automata such as Conway's Game of Life, a breeder is a pattern that exhibits quadratic growth, by generating multiple copies of a secondary pattern, each of which then generates multiple copies of a tertiary pattern.

Classification
Breeders can be classed by the relative motion of the patterns.  The classes are denoted by three-letter codes, which denote whether the primary, secondary and tertiary elements respectively are moving (M) or stationary (S).  The four basic types are:
 SMM – A gun that fires out rakes.
 MSM – A puffer that leaves guns in its wake.
 MMS – A rake that fires out puffers.
 MMM – A rake that fires out more rakes, such that there are no stationary elements.

A spacefiller (which also undergoes quadratic growth) may be thought of as a fifth class of breeder.  However it differs from a true breeder in that it expands a single island of cells, rather than creating independent objects.

References

Cellular automaton patterns